"Living It Down" is a single by American country music artist Freddy Fender. Released in 1976, it was the first single from his album If You're Ever in Texas. The song peaked at number 2 on the Billboard Hot Country Singles chart. It also reached number 1 on the RPM Country Tracks chart in Canada.

Chart performance

References

1976 singles
Freddy Fender songs
Dot Records singles
1976 songs